Darryn William Hill (born 11 August 1974 in Perth) is an Australian former racing cyclist, specialising in the sprint events of track cycling. Hill was an Australian Institute of Sport scholarship holder.

Major results

1994
Commonwealth Games, Victoria
  1 km time trial
  Sprint
 Track Cycling World Championships, Palermo
  Sprint

1995
 Track Cycling World Championships, Bogotá
  Sprint

1996
 Track Cycling World Championships, Manchester
  Team Sprint (with Shane Kelly and Gary Neiwand)
  Sprint

1997
 Track Cycling World Championships, Perth
  Sprint

1998
 Track Cycling World Cup
  Keirin, Berlin
Commonwealth Games, Kual Lumpur
   Sprint

1999
Track Cycling World Cup
  Sprint, Mexico City

2000
 Olympic Games, Sydney
  Sprint

References

External links 
 
 

Australian male cyclists
Australian Institute of Sport cyclists
Commonwealth Games bronze medallists for Australia
Commonwealth Games silver medallists for Australia
Cyclists at the 1994 Commonwealth Games
Cyclists at the 1998 Commonwealth Games
Cyclists at the 2000 Summer Olympics
Olympic bronze medalists for Australia
Olympic cyclists of Australia
UCI Track Cycling World Champions (men)
1974 births
Living people
Sportsmen from Western Australia
Commonwealth Games gold medallists for Australia
Olympic medalists in cycling
Cyclists from Perth, Western Australia
Cyclists at the 1996 Summer Olympics
Medalists at the 2000 Summer Olympics
Commonwealth Games medallists in cycling
Australian track cyclists
Medallists at the 1994 Commonwealth Games
Medallists at the 1998 Commonwealth Games